"Summer Nights" is a song by hip hop recording artist Lil Rob from his sixth studio album Twelve Eighteen, Pt. 1. It was released on June 28, 2005 via Upstairs Records as the lead single from the album. Production was handled by Fingazz. The song peaked at number 36 on the US Billboard Hot 100 singles chart.

Charts

References

External links

2005 songs
2005 singles